The 1961 Colchester by-election was a parliamentary by-election for the British House of Commons constituency of Colchester on 16 March 1961.

Vacancy
It was held due to the incumbent Conservative MP, Cuthbert Alport becoming British High Commissioner to Rhodesia and so getting a Life Peerage on appointment.  He had been MP here since gaining the seat in 1950.

Election history
Colchester had been won by the Conservatives at every election since 1950 when they gained the seat from Labour. The result at the last General election was as follows;

Candidates
The Conservatives selected Antony Buck.
The Liberals selected airline pilot Howard Levett Fry. He was born in December 1912 and was educated at Paxton Park School and St. Paul's School, London. He joined the R.A.F. in 1932 and transferred to Imperial Airways in 1937. He flew transport aircraft during the war. After the war he was a Senior Captain first class with B.O.A.C. He was a founder member of the British Air Line Pilots' Association. He was Vice-Chairman of the Britannia Pilots' Council. He was a member of the Liberal Party Executive and the Party Council. Fry contested Aylesbury in 1959 and 1955 and New Forest in 1950.
Labour re-selected John Wilson Fear.

Result

Aftermath
The result at the 1964 general election;

References

 

Colchester by-election
History of Colchester
By-elections to the Parliament of the United Kingdom in Essex constituencies
Politics of Colchester
Colchester by-election
Colchester by-election
1960s in Essex